The 2019 Metro Atlantic Athletic Conference baseball tournament was held from May 22 through 25. The top six regular season finishers of the league's eleven teams met in the double-elimination tournament to be held at Richmond County Bank Ballpark in Staten Island, New York. The tournament champion, Quinnipiac, earned the conference's automatic bid to the 2019 NCAA Division I baseball tournament.

Seeding
The top six teams were seeded one through four based on their conference winning percentage. They then played a double-elimination tournament.

Results

Conference championship

References

Tournament
Metro Atlantic Athletic Conference Baseball Tournament
Metro Atlantic Athletic Conference baseball tournament